Minneapolis–Saint Paul, also known as the Twin Cities of Minneapolis and Saint Paul, in the state of Minnesota, United States of America, has two major general-interest newspapers. The region is currently ranked as the 15th largest television market in the United States.   The market officially includes 59 counties of Minnesota and Wisconsin, and extends far to the north and west. The radio market in the Twin Cities is estimated to be slightly smaller, ranked 16th in the nation.

Print

The two major general-interest newspapers are the Star Tribune in Minneapolis and the Saint Paul Pioneer Press. Mpls.St.Paul Magazine covers arts and culture, shops, and the dining scene in the Twin Cities. The Minnesota Daily serves the University of Minnesota's Twin Cities campus and surrounding neighborhoods. The Minnesota Spokesman-Recorder, One Nation News and the Finance and Commerce business daily are published in Minneapolis, as is the Web-based MinnPost.com.

A number of other weekly and monthly publications (most of which are fully supported by advertising) are also available.  The most prominent of these is Village Voice Media's City Pages, the alternative weekly. (2002 newcomer The Rake offered some competition in the form of a free monthly, but ceased publication in 2008.) Pulse of the Twin Cities is another weekly which has less advertising and more coverage of local music and activism. La Matraca News is a Spanish Language Weekly print and online publication.

There are also numerous weekly student publications at area colleges, including the University of Minnesota's The Wake student magazine, Macalester College's The Mac Weekly, and St. Thomas' TommieMedia.com, which replaced student newspaper The Aquin that was shuttered in 2009.

Minneapolis community newspapers include the sister publications Downtown Journal, formerly Skyway News, and Southwest Journal, which cover downtown and southwest Minneapolis, respectively, as well as numerous neighborhood papers such as the North News, Seward Profile, Southside Pride, and Whittier Globe.

Only one weekly newspaper is devoted to neighborhood news in either city: St. Paul's East Side Review. Saint Paul also has a monthly, Highland Villager, and a bi-monthly neighborhood newspaper for Frogtown, Greening Frogtown.

Instead of neighborhood or general-interest news, some periodicals are topical, such as those covering the Minnesota music scene. Others are audience-specific, such as Lavender Magazine for the state's gay community. The Minnesota Women's Press, one of the few feminist newspapers in the country, serves the local feminist community. Another periodical of note is the Asian American Press.

Television

The only major television station in the Twin Cities with its main studios located in Minneapolis is WCCO-TV, a CBS owned-and-operated station that broadcasts from studios along Nicollet Mall in downtown Minneapolis. Five other stations maintain studios in St. Paul: Twin Cities Public Television operates both of the Twin Cities' PBS member stations, KTCA and KTCI. ABC affiliate KSTP-TV and independent station KSTC-TV are owned by Hubbard Broadcasting. The local affiliate of The CW, WUCW, is owned by Sinclair Broadcast Group.

Three other stations serve the Twin Cities from studios in suburban areas. Fox O&O KMSP-TV and MyNetworkTV O&O WFTC are co-owned by Fox Television Stations, with studios located in Eden Prairie. KARE is the NBC affiliate in the Twin Cities, owned by TEGNA and based in Golden Valley.
 
For much of the last two decades, KARE had the most popular evening newscasts. Since around 2010, however, WCCO has become the most watched station in the market in nearly all time slots. On the other end, KSTP has struggled to maintain ratings on its news programs. KMSP has had a 9 o'clock newscast since at least the early 1990s when it was a UPN affiliate.

KSTP claims to have been the first station in the country to run a regular nightly newscast. It is the oldest station in the state to still be operating, having first gone on the air in 1948. TV broadcasts first occurred more than a decade earlier during the 1930s when engineers for radio station WDGY (now KFAN) experimented with a mechanical television system. Mechanical TV quickly lost favor, and the station's owner decided to let the license expire in 1938.

Communities in the region have their own Public, educational, and government access (PEG) cable TV channels.  One channel, the Metro Cable Network, is available on channel 6 on cable systems across the seven-county region.  Minneapolis Telecommunications Network (MTN) has three public-access television cable TV channels and Saint Paul Neighborhood Network (SPNN) has two.

Area residents of the right age look back fondly on many of the locally produced shows that were on the air for about two decades, from the early days of TV in Minnesota up until the 1970s. WCCO, KSTP, KMSP, and WTCN (now KARE) all had children's shows, though there were a few other notable shows targeting an older audience.

Several television programs originating in the Twin Cities have been aired nationally on terrestrial and cable TV networks.  KTCA created the science program Newton's Apple and distributes a children's program today. A few unusual comedic shows also originated in the area. In the 1980s, KTMA (now WUCW) created a number of low-budget shows, including the cult classic Mystery Science Theater 3000 (which later aired on The Comedy Channel/Comedy Central from 1989 to 1996 and the Sci-Fi Channel from 1997 to 2004). The short-lived Let's Bowl (which aired on Comedy Central) started on KARE, and the PBS series Mental Engineering originated on the St. Paul public-access television network.

Two episodes of Route 66 were made in Minneapolis in the 1960s. The 1970s CBS situation comedy set in Minneapolis, The Mary Tyler Moore Show, won three Golden Globes and 29 Emmy Awards. The show's opening sequences were filmed in the city.

Radio

Most of the major TV and radio transmitters are located in Shoreview, Minnesota, and backup facilities for some are maintained atop the IDS Center in downtown Minneapolis (though a few low-power broadcasters use the IDS as their primary transmitter location).

Movies
Movies filmed in Minneapolis include Airport (1970), The Heartbreak Kid (1972), Slaughterhouse-Five (1972), Ice Castles (1978), Foolin' Around (1980), Take This Job and Shove It (1981), Purple Rain (1984), That Was Then, This Is Now (1985), The Mighty Ducks (1992), Untamed Heart (1993), Little Big League (1994), Beautiful Girls (1996), Jingle All the Way (1996), Fargo (1996), and Young Adult (2011).

List of newspapers and magazines

The following is a list of print publications in the Minneapolis–St. Paul metropolitan area:

Daily
Finance and Commerce (Minneapolis)
MinnPost.com (Minneapolis)
St. Paul Pioneer Press (St. Paul)
Star Tribune (Minneapolis)
Twin Cities Daily Planet (Minneapolis)

Weekly
Minneapolis / St. Paul Business Journal (Minneapolis)
Minnesota Spokesman-Recorder (Minneapolis)
La Matraca News (Spanish/Latino newspaper)
One Nation News

College
The Echo (Augsburg University student newspaper)
The Mac Weekly (Macalester College student newspaper)
The Minnesota Daily (University of Minnesota student newspaper)
TommieMedia (University of St. Thomas student news website)
The Wake (University of Minnesota student magazine)
The Clarion (Bethel University student newspaper and magazine)
The Oracle (Hamline University student newspaper)

Other
 Bring Me The News
 DUNation
 Game Informer
 Minnesota Monthly
 Mpls.St.Paul Magazine
 Patch.com
 Twin Cities Arts Reader
 Sahan Journal

Neighborhood press
In Minneapolis:
Bryn Mawr Bugle, published monthly
Camden Community News, published monthly
Longfellow Nokomis Messenger, published monthly
North News, published monthly
Northeast Beat, online only
Northeaster, published bimonthly
Seward Profile, published monthly
Southside Pride, published monthly
Whittier Globe, published monthly

In St. Paul:
East Side Review, published weekly
Midway-Como-North End Monitor, published monthly
Park Bugle, published monthly
Villager, published twice-monthly
West Seventh Community Reporter, published monthly

Special Interest
Asian American Press
La Matraca News in Spanish for Minnesota's Latino community
Catholic Spirit
Lavender Magazine, for Minnesota's LGBT community
The Minnesota Women's Press, feminist newspaper
Profane Existence, the world's largest circulating anarcho-punk magazine
Whistling Shade, a Twin Cities literary journal

List of television stations
This is a list of Television Stations in the Minneapolis-St.Paul area.

Broadcast
Network owned-and-operated stations are highlighted in bold.

Cable
Metro Cable Network Cable channel 6
Minneapolis Telecommunications Network (MTN)
Bally Sports North (BSN)
Spectrum News 1 Wisconsin (on Spectrum systems on Wisconsin side of market)

List of radio stations

AM

FM

References

External links

NorthPine.com: Upper Midwest broadcasting
Radiotapes.com - historical recordings, photos and documents from Twin Cities radio stations dating to 1924
TwinCitiesRadioAirchecks.com - historical recordings and photos of Twin Cities radio stations
Eastern Minnesota television stations
Twin Cities media discussion forum
Your Midwest Media: radio and TV station listings, news and information

Minneapolis-St. Paul